John Jerome Herrick (June 23, 1920 – August 2, 1997) was an officer in the United States Navy who was commander of the U.S.S. Maddox during the Gulf of Tonkin Incident in August 1964.  Herrick gave the order to return fire on three Viet Cong patrol boats.
In 2005, however, an internal National Security Agency historical study was declassified; it concluded that Maddox had engaged the North Vietnamese Navy on August 2. The report stated, regarding the first incident on August 2, that "at 1500G, Captain Herrick ordered Ogier's gun crews to open fire if the boats approached within ten thousand yards. At about 1505G, Maddox fired three rounds to warn off the communist boats. This initial action was never reported by the Johnson administration, which insisted that the Vietnamese boats fired first."

Herrick was born in Warren, Minnesota, son of James Orival Herrick and Lillian (Cowley) Herrick, where his father was depot agent for the Soo Line Railroad.  He attended University of Wisconsin - Superior before entering the United States Naval Academy.  At the academy, his nickname was Jiglig.  On May 1, 1948, in La Jolla, California, he married Geraldine Kane (1921-2003), the daughter of a retired Navy dentist.  They had three sons and a daughter.  He was a commander of landing ships (medium rockets) during the Korean War.

Herrick died in 1997 and was buried at Santa Fe National Cemetery in New Mexico.

Herrick's older brother Curtis J. Herrick (1909-1971, USMA 1931) was a general in the United States Army.

References

External links
link to photo

1920 births
1997 deaths
People from Warren, Minnesota
People from Superior, Wisconsin
20th-century American naval officers
University of Wisconsin–Superior alumni
United States Naval Academy alumni
United States Navy personnel of the Vietnam War
Military personnel from Wisconsin
Military personnel from Minnesota